An arbitrarily varying channel (AVC) is a communication channel model used in coding theory, and was first introduced by Blackwell, Breiman, and Thomasian. The state  in set  can vary arbitrarily at each time unit . This channel was developed as an alternative to Shannon's Binary Symmetric Channel (BSC), where the entire nature of the channel is known, to be more realistic to actual network channel situations.

Capacities and associated proofs

Capacity of deterministic AVCs
An AVC's capacity can vary depending on the certain parameters.

Before stating Theorem 1, a few definitions need to be addressed:

  is equal to the average probability that  will be a certain value based on all the values  could possibly be equal to.

Theorem 1:  if and only if the AVC is not symmetric.  If , then .

Proof of 1st part for symmetry: If we can prove that  is positive when the AVC is not symmetric, and then prove that , we will be able to prove Theorem 1. By using equation , (and remembering ,) we can get,

because only  depends on  now

because 

Therefore,  can only be positive if the AVC is not symmetric.

Proof of second part for capacity:  See the paper "The capacity of the arbitrarily varying channel revisited: positivity, constraints," referenced below for full proof.

Capacity of AVCs with input and state constraints

The next theorem will deal with the capacity for AVCs with input and/or state constraints.  These constraints help to decrease the very large range of possibilities for transmission and error on an AVC, making it a bit easier to see how the AVC behaves.

Before we go on to Theorem 2, we need to define a few definitions and lemmas:

For such AVCs, there exists:
- 

The usefulness of the input constraint  and the state constraint  will be based on these equations.

For AVCs with input and/or state constraints, the rate  is now limited to codewords of format  that satisfy , and now the state  is limited to all states that satisfy .

Therefore, it would be very unlikely to receive a codeword without error. This is why the  condition is present in Theorem 2.

Proof of Theorem 2: See the paper "The capacity of the arbitrarily varying channel revisited: positivity, constraints," referenced below for full proof.

Capacity of randomized AVCs
The next theorem will be for AVCs with randomized  code.  For such AVCs the code is a random variable with values from a family of length-n block codes, and these codes are not allowed to depend/rely on the actual value of the codeword.  These codes have the same maximum and average error probability value for any channel because of its random nature.  These types of codes also help to make certain properties of the AVC more clear.

Before we go on to Theorem 3, we need to define a couple important terms first:

Proof of Theorem 3:  See paper "The Capacities of Certain Channel Classes Under Random Coding" referenced below for full proof.

See also
 Binary symmetric channel
 Binary erasure channel
 Z-channel (information theory)
 Channel model
 Information theory
 Coding theory

References 

 Ahlswede, Rudolf and Blinovsky, Vladimir, "Classical Capacity of Classical-Quantum Arbitrarily Varying Channels,"  https://ieeexplore.ieee.org/document/4069128
 Blackwell, David, Breiman, Leo, and Thomasian, A. J.,  "The Capacities of Certain Channel Classes Under Random Coding,"  https://www.jstor.org/stable/2237566
 Csiszar, I. and Narayan, P., "Arbitrarily varying channels with constrained inputs and states," http://ieeexplore.ieee.org/stamp/stamp.jsp?tp=&arnumber=2598&isnumber=154
 Csiszar, I. and Narayan, P., "Capacity and Decoding Rules for Classes of Arbitrarily Varying Channels," http://ieeexplore.ieee.org/stamp/stamp.jsp?tp=&arnumber=32153&isnumber=139
 Csiszar, I. and Narayan, P., "The capacity of the arbitrarily varying channel revisited: positivity, constraints," http://ieeexplore.ieee.org/stamp/stamp.jsp?tp=&arnumber=2627&isnumber=155
 Lapidoth, A. and Narayan, P., "Reliable communication under channel uncertainty," http://ieeexplore.ieee.org/stamp/stamp.jsp?tp=&arnumber=720535&isnumber=15554

Coding theory